The 2022 CAFA Women's Futsal Championship was the inaugural edition of CAFA Women's Futsal Championship, the annual international futsal championship organized by CAFA for the women's national futsal teams of Central Asia.

Iran won the title to become the first CAFA Women's Futsal Championship champions.

Participating nations
A total of 4 (out of 6) CAFA member national teams entered the tournament.

Did not enter

Format
As the inaugural tournament saw 4 countries participating. A double round-robin format was used for the tournament. with two games each matchday.

Tiebreakers
Teams are ranked according to points (3 points for a win, 1 point for a draw, 0 points for a loss), and if tied on points, the following tiebreaking criteria are applied, in the order given, to determine the rankings (Regulations Article 10.5):
Points in head-to-head matches among tied teams;
Goal difference in head-to-head matches among tied teams;
Goals scored in head-to-head matches among tied teams;
If more than two teams are tied, and after applying all head-to-head criteria above, a subset of teams are still tied, all head-to-head criteria above are reapplied exclusively to this subset of teams;
Goal difference in all group matches;
Goals scored in all group matches;
Penalty shoot-out if only two teams are tied and they met in the last round of the group;
Disciplinary points (yellow card = 1 point, red card as a result of two yellow cards = 3 points, direct red card = 3 points, yellow card followed by direct red card = 4 points);

Squads

Match officials
A total of 10 referees were appointed for the tournament.

Referees

  Nasim Kiani Moghaddam
  Zahra Rahimi
  Chyngyz Mustafaev
  Myrzabek Zhaparov
  Talantbek Raimberdiev
  Natalia Sotnikova
  Rashid Saidtabarov
  Zukhal Khuchanazarova
  Khusan Muzaffarov
  Umid Pulatov

Main Tournament
Times are TJT (UTC+5).

Tournament table

Champion

Player awards
The following awards were given at the conclusion of the tournament:

Goalscorers

See also
 2022 WAFF Women's Futsal Championship

References

CAFA Women's Futsal Championship
2022 in Asian futsal
January 2022 sports events in Asia